Tumleo is an Austronesian language of coastal Sandaun Province, Papua New Guinea, on Tumleo Island and the Aitape coast in East Aitape Rural LLG.

External links 
 Paradisec has a number of collections with materials in Tumleo language.

References

Schouten languages
Languages of Sandaun Province